Prabhakar Sharan is the first Indian Latin American Hero who acts in Bollywood & Latin American films.

Life and career
Prabhakar Sharan (born 22 February 1980) was born in Motihari, Bihar, India and is from a small city, Motihari, Bihar, He left 18 years back to Costa Rica, Central America for his studies and acting career. His struggle with the Spanish language, his day and night hard work, and his strong love for India and Indian culture pushed him to introduce Bollywood movies and Social Activities to promote India in Central America. He became the board member of the university where he came to study. He is the first person to introduce Hindi movies in Central America, He also executed live shows and did the FIRST INDIAN LATIN AMERICAN MOVIE IN THE YEAR 2017-2018 (Enredados La Confusion), which became successful.
He became the first Indian to act as lead and direct in a Spanish feature film. He got many awards as the Best Actor, Best debut director, Best film in the United States, and with many International Prestigious film festivals and Government Organizations. His dream to become an actor has given him a journey of struggle, survival, and success which has become an inspiration not just for Costa Rica, but the whole of Central America and India.
He is the first Indian actor to appear in a Latin American film; called Enredados: la confusion. Prabhakar landed in Costa Rica as a student at Universidad Panamericana in 2000 and became President of the University in the year 2018. He started Movie distribution, production, and a chain of different businesses.

Enredados La Confusion/1 Chor 2 Mastikhor
Enredados: la confusion directed by Prabhakar Sharan was shot at different locations, of India, Costa Rica, and Panama with the support of  famous professionals such as award-winning cinematographer Suresh Beesaveni, Parvez Shaikh, Tapan Jyoti Dutta, Kaushal Kathak, Rakesh Sharma, Sunil Balu and  more than 1200actors and extras from Latin America and India. Due to "Enredados La Confusion" a huge market has opened for Indian Producers and vice versa. Many Co-production deals have been signed recently to follow the same Bollywood recipe which will work for both industries. The movie developed a new market for Indian cinema which was totally untouched by people of Bollywood. The film was encouraged by Indian Embassies in Panama, Salvador, Guatemala, Costa Rica, Nicaragua, and Peru and the United States. The Indian Ambassadors of the respective countries supported the movie with proud participation in the event of the premier and concluded every effort to make it a successful cultural venture. Now soon it's ready to release in Hindi and Bhojpuri in India this year 2019 as 1 Chor 2 Mastikhor, It is a film produced under the banner of Pacific Investment Corporation. 
Cast of the Film Prabhakar Sharan, Nancy Dobles,(Presenter in the best channel 7 of Costa Rica and winner of several Latin American television programs), International Comedian-actor Mario Chacon, experienced actor José Castro and includes former WWE world champion and Hollywood actor, Scott Steiner.

See also

 List of Indian film actors

References

External links
 

1980 births
Living people
21st-century Indian male actors
Indian male film actors
Male actors in Hindi cinema
People from Patna